Schlock may refer to:

Schlock (film), a 1973 film by John Landis
Shlock Rock, a Jewish rock band formed in 1985
Dr. Irving Schlock, a character in the 1997 webcomic Sluggy Freelance
Schlock Mercenary, a webcomic by Howard Tayler created in 2000